The Outlaw (Persian: Yaghi) is a 1953 Iranian film directed by Mehdi Besharatian.

References

Bibliography 
 Mohammad Ali Issari. Cinema in Iran, 1900-1979. Scarecrow Press, 1989.

External links 
 

1953 films
1950s Persian-language films
Films directed by Mehdi Besharatian
Iranian black-and-white films